The Society of the Mines Royal was one of two English mining monopoly companies incorporated by royal charter in 1568, the other being the Company of Mineral and Battery Works.

History
On 28 May 1568, Elizabeth I established the Society by letters patent as a joint stock company with 24 shareholders:

Haug, Langnauer & Company, Augsburg
Sir William Cecil
Thomas Thurland, Master of the Savoy
Edmund Thurland
Roger Wetheral
Robert Dudley, 1st Earl of Leicester
William Humfrey of the Mint
Benedict Spinola
Cornelius de Vos
Jeffrey Duckett
Richard Springham, alderman
James Blount, 6th Baron Mountjoy
John Dudley
William Winter
George Needham
William Patten
Jeffrey "Wolcheton"
Lionel Duckett, alderman
John Tamworth
Matthew Field
Edmund "Worschopp"
Anthony Duckett of Grayrigg, Westmorland
William Burd (Treasurer to the Company)
Thomas Smythe, Customer
William Herbert, 1st Earl of Pembroke
Richard Barnes, alderman

The establishment of the Society may have been the result of the Queen's success in the Case of Mines. The new Society was granted a mining monopoly for base metals in several English and Welsh counties, including some where there were recoverable mines.  It worked mines in Cumberland and had a smelting plant near Keswick in Cumberland. It also opened a copper smelting plant near Neath.

In the 1670s, the Society associated itself with the Company of Mineral and Battery Works, but perhaps only informally. Its monopoly disappeared under the Mines Royal Act of 1690. In the 1690s, some of its mines were leased to another mining syndicate known as Mines Royal Copper, and that enterprise subsequently became the London Lead Company.

For the later history of the company, as amalgamated with the Company of Mineral and Battery Works, see that article.

Further reading
M. B. Donald, Elizabethan Copper.

Notes

References

Defunct mining companies of the United Kingdom
1568 establishments in England
Companies established in the 16th century